Boris Aleksandrovich Furmanov (17 December 1936 – 8 February 2022) was a Russian politician.

He served as Minister of Architecture, Construction, and Housing from 1991 to 1992. He died on 8 February 2022, at the age of 85.

References

1936 births
2022 deaths
Soviet politicians
Russian politicians
Russian people of Ukrainian descent
Communist Party of the Soviet Union members
Recipients of the Order of the Red Banner of Labour
Recipients of the Order of Friendship of Peoples
People from Sievierodonetsk